The National Collegiate Athletic Association (NCAA) is divided into three divisions based on scholarship allocation. Each division is made up of several conferences for regional league competition. Unless otherwise noted, changes in conference affiliation will occur on July 1 of the given year.

Division I

Under NCAA regulations, all Division I conferences defined as "multisport conferences" must meet the following criteria:
 A total of at least seven active Division I members.
 Separate from the above, at least seven active Division I members that sponsor both men's and women's basketball.
 Sponsorship of at least 12 NCAA Division I sports.
 Minimum of six men's sports, with the following additional restrictions:
 Men's basketball is a mandatory sport, and at least seven members must sponsor that sport.
 Non-football conferences must sponsor at least two men's team sports other than basketball.
 At least six members must sponsor five men's sports other than basketball, including either football or two other team sports.
 Minimum of six women's sports, with the following additional restrictions:
 Women's basketball is a mandatory sport, with at least seven members sponsoring that sport.
 At least two other women's team sports must be sponsored.
 At least six members must sponsor five women's sports other than basketball, including two other team sports. If a conference officially sponsors an NCAA "emerging sport" for women (as of 2020, acrobatics & tumbling, equestrianism, rugby union, triathlon, or wrestling), that sport will be counted if five members (instead of six) sponsor it.

Schools in all divisions that sponsor athletic programs for only one sex/gender need only meet the sports sponsorship requirements for that sex/gender.

Football Bowl Subdivision
Conferences in the Football Bowl Subdivision must meet a more stringent set of NCAA requirements than other conferences. Among these additional NCAA regulations, institutions in the Football Bowl Subdivision must be "multisport conferences" and participate in conference play in at least six men's and eight women's sports, including football, men's and women's basketball, and at least two other women's team sports. Each school may count one men's and one women's sport not sponsored by its primary conference toward the above limits, as long as that sport competes in another Division I conference. The men's and women's sports so counted need not be the same sport.

Football Championship Subdivision
In addition to competing in football, multisport conferences in the Football Championship Subdivision must still meet the general NCAA Division I requirements regarding the minimum number of men's and women's sports (see above).

Non-football, multi-sport conferences
Multisport conferences that do not compete in football must still meet the general NCAA Division I requirements regarding the minimum number of men's and women's sports (see above).

Ice hockey conferences

Division I ice hockey has a different conference structure than the above multisport conferences. These schools have memberships in other conferences for other sports.

Other single-sport conferences
This list includes conferences in sports that the NCAA does not fully split into divisions, such as men's volleyball and rifle. Sports in which the NCAA sponsors separate championships for men and women are officially treated by the NCAA as two separate sports.

Division II

Among the NCAA regulations, Division II institutions have to sponsor at least five sports for men and five for women (or four for men and six for women), with two team sports for each sex, and each playing season represented by each sex. Teams that consist of both men and women are counted as men's teams for sports sponsorship purposes.

Current conferences
Conferences that sponsor football are highlighted in yellow.

Single-sport conferences

Other sports
These all-sports conferences sponsor sports which do not have D-II championships.

Division III

Unlike the other two divisions, Division III institutions cannot offer athletic scholarships. Among the other NCAA Division III requirements, schools have sports sponsorship requirements set by the NCAA. All institutions, regardless of enrollment, must sponsor at least three team sports for each sex/gender, and each playing season represented by each sex/gender.

A sports sponsorship rule unique to Division III is that the total number of sports that must be sponsored differs by a school's full-time undergraduate enrollment. Schools with an enrollment of 1,000 or fewer must sponsor at least five sports for men and five for women; those with larger enrollments must sponsor six men's and six women's sports. As in the other divisions, teams that include both men and women are treated as men's sports for the purpose of these regulations.

Current conferences
Conferences that sponsor football highlighted in yellow.

Single-sport conferences

Other sports
These all-sports conferences sponsor sports which do not have D-III championships.

Defunct NCAA conferences

* - Operated before the NCAA split into divisions in 1955.

In addition to the above, two of the five conferences that currently participate in the NCAA's National Collegiate division (equivalent to Division I) of women's ice hockey once operated men's divisions:

See also

List of college athletic conferences in the United States
List of schools reclassifying their athletic programs to NCAA Division I
List of NAIA conferences

References

College athletics conferences

ja:カンファレンス (カレッジスポーツ)